Su Lee is a South Korean musician. She rose to fame in 2020 when her music video "I'll Just Dance" went viral on YouTube and Spotify. The song and music video were written and recorded in her 10' by 10' bedroom in Seoul, South Korea during the COVID-19 pandemic.

Early life 
Lee was born in and spent much of her childhood in South Korea, aside from a stint in Boston, Massachusetts in elementary and middle school. She pursued a degree in International Relations at a university in Seoul but transferred to Falmouth University to study graphic design for three years, graduating in 2019. She interned in London, living in a hostel for a month.

Discography 
 Box Room Dreams (August 26, 2021)
 Messy Sexy (October 28, 2022)

References

1997 births
Living people
Korean musicians
Social media influencers